Allen "A. J." Moyer (born October 6, 1987) is an American professional stock car racing driver. He currently competes part-time in the ARCA Menards Series, driving the No. 06 Chevrolet/Toyota for Wayne Peterson Racing.

Racing career

Early racing career

ARCA Menards Series 
On April 11, 2021, Moyer would announce on Twitter that he would be making his debut with Wayne Peterson Racing at the 2021 Herr's Potato Chips 200. He would finish 9th, garnering his first top 10. He would make one more start at the 2021 Sioux Chief PowerPEX 200, finishing 15th.

Personal life 
A. J. is the son of the 1981 ARCA Racing Series champion Larry Moyer.

Motorsports career results

ARCA Menards Series 
(key) (Bold – Pole position awarded by qualifying time. Italics – Pole position earned by points standings or practice time. * – Most laps led.)

ARCA Menards Series East

ARCA Menards Series West

References

External links 

 A. J. Moyer driver statistics at Racing-Reference

1987 births
Living people
ARCA Menards Series drivers
NASCAR drivers
Racing drivers from Tampa, Florida